Senator Darling may refer to:

Alberta Darling (born 1944), Wisconsin State Senate
Hale K. Darling (1869–1940), Vermont State Senate
John P. Darling (1815–1882), New York State Senate